The following is a list of National Basketball Association (NBA) players who won the most championships as a player. The NBA is a major professional basketball league in North America. It was founded in 1946 as the Basketball Association of America (BAA). The league adopted its current name at the start of the  when it merged with the National Basketball League (NBL). The NBA Finals is the championship series for the NBA and the conclusion of the sport's postseason. The winning team of the series receives the Larry O'Brien Championship Trophy. Players from the winning team usually receive championship rings from the team honoring their contribution, with "rings" becoming shorthand for championships. However, in some rare occasion, the teams opted to give other commemorative items, such as wrist watches, instead of rings. The number of championships won by NBA superstars is often used as a measurement of their greatness. Though this has been subject to criticism and debate with some arguing that is a misconception and that championships matter less overall in the measure of a players greatness as many great players have played on teams that were considered weak or failed to meet the status of a contender despite having a great player. And many players considered below average have played on strong teams that won championships consistently and were consistently contenders.

Boston Celtics center Bill Russell holds the record for the most NBA championships won with 11 titles during his 13-year playing career. He won his first championship with the Boston Celtics in his rookie year. Afterwards, he went on to win ten championships in the next 12 years, including eight consecutive championships from 1959 to 1966. He won the last two championships in 1968 and 1969 as player-coach. Russell's teammate, Sam Jones, won ten championships from 1959 to 1969, the second most in NBA history. Four Celtics players, Tom Heinsohn, K. C. Jones, Satch Sanders and John Havlicek, won eight championships each, with Havlicek being the only one to win championships independently of Russell. Two other Celtics, Jim Loscutoff and Frank Ramsey, won seven championships each.

Robert Horry also won seven championships (with three teams). Four players, Bob Cousy, Kareem Abdul-Jabbar, Michael Jordan and Scottie Pippen, won six championships each. Jordan and Pippen are members of the Chicago Bulls team who won three consecutive championships twice in the 1990s. George Mikan won two championships in the NBL before it merged with the BAA to form the NBA, and won five championships in the NBA. Magic Johnson won five championships with the Los Angeles Lakers in the 1980s.

Robert Horry, John Salley, LeBron James and Danny Green are the only players to have won championships with three different teams. Horry won seven championships: two with the Houston Rockets, three with the Los Angeles Lakers and another two with San Antonio Spurs. Salley's four NBA titles came via two championships with the Detroit Pistons and one each with the Bulls and the Lakers. Horry is also the only non-Celtic to win more than six times. Frank Saul, Steve Kerr, Patrick McCaw, Danny Green and Chris Boucher are the only players to win two championships with two different teams in consecutive seasons. Saul won consecutive championships with the Rochester Royals and the Minneapolis Lakers in the 1950s, Kerr won consecutive championships with the Bulls and the Spurs in the 1990s, McCaw and Boucher with the Golden State Warriors and the Toronto Raptors in 2018 and 2019, and Green with the Raptors and Los Angeles Lakers in 2019 and 2020. Both Saul and Kerr won NBA championships for four years in a row, each having participated in three-peats, Saul with the Lakers and Kerr with the Bulls.

List

See also 
List of NBA champions
List of NBA championship head coaches

Notes 
 Russell was inducted both as a player and as a coach.
 Heinsohn won two additional championships in 1974 and 1976 as head coach of the Boston Celtics.
 Jones won four additional championships: in 1972 as assistant coach of the Los Angeles Lakers, in 1981 as assistant coach of the Boston Celtics, and in 1984 and 1986 as head coach of the Celtics.
 Sanders was inducted into the Hall of Fame as a contributor.
 Loscutoff did not play in the 1960 Playoffs and Finals due to injury.
 Alcindor changed his name to Kareem Abdul-Jabbar in 1971 after winning his first championship. He also won two championships as an assistant coach with the Lakers in 2009 and 2010.
 Nelson was inducted into the Hall of Fame as a coach.
 Kerr won additional championships in 2015, 2017, 2018 and 2022 as head coach of the Golden State Warriors.
 Sharman won an additional championship in 1972 as head coach of the Los Angeles Lakers.
 Wilkes did not play in the 1985 playoffs due to injury, but remained on the roster until after the Finals.
 Kupchak was injured 26 games into the 1981-1982 season, resulting him him missing the remainder of that season including the playoffs. He did not remain on the roster, but he did receive recognition as a member of the 1982 championship team.

References

Citations

Sources 

most championships